Kobé is one of three departments in Wadi Fira, a region of Chad. Its capital is Iriba.

Departments of Chad